Miguel 'Miki' Massana Macià (born 11 May 1989) is a Spanish professional footballer who plays as a midfielder.

Born in Lleida, Catalonia, Massana's professional input consisted of 15 games in the Cypriot First Division with AEK Larnaca FC, where he shared teams with a host of compatriots.

References

External links
 
 
 

1989 births
Living people
Sportspeople from Lleida
Spanish footballers
Footballers from Catalonia
Association football midfielders
Segunda División B players
Tercera División players
UE Lleida players
Lleida Esportiu footballers
FC Santboià players
SD Amorebieta footballers
CF Balaguer footballers
Cypriot First Division players
AEK Larnaca FC players
Spanish expatriate footballers
Expatriate footballers in Cyprus